Marion High School is a high school located in the growing city of Marion, Illinois, serving the Marion Unit 2 School District. The school's enrollment was approximately 1,125 students in the 2013–2014 school year.  Marion Unit #2 School District built a new high school on the same property, that is completely finished.

In addition to Marion it serves Creal Springs.

Campus
The proposed cost was $65 million. Construction on the facility began in 2012, with a wing for fine arts scheduled to be finished in 2017. It includes geothermal heating.

In 2016 Marion CUSD had not yet received the requested federal and state funds for finishing the new high school's construction, so the school board was determining whether it should take out a credit line for up to $7.3 million for that purpose.

Curriculum
In 2015 the students began using Chromebooks.

Notable alumni
Aaron Adeoye, NFL player
Homer M. Butler, American newspaper editor, journalist, and politician
Ray Fosse, former professional baseball player and television color commentator

References

Public high schools in Illinois
Marion, Illinois
Schools in Williamson County, Illinois